Pravin Datke (born 16 Dec 1978) is currently National Vice President Bharatiya Janata Yuva Morcha and Municipal Corporator and former Mayor of Nagpur Municipal Corporation. He was State General Secretary BJYM Maharashtra Unit.

Early life
Datke was born to Prabhakarrao Datke, a Founder of Shikshak Sahakari Bank Limited, Nagpur.
His father, Prabhakarrao Datke, died of heart attack in 1995.

Education and early career
Datke is a 10th pass from Navyug Madhyamik Vidyalaya, Mahal, Nagpur.

Family and personal life
Pravin is the son of former BJP Leader Late Sh. Prabhakarrao Datke. Sh Prabhakarrao was also known for Teachers Union Leader & Founder of NAGPUR Shikshak SahakarI Bank Limited..

Political career

In 2004, at age 25, Datke was elected as a corporator from Mahal ward. After two terms Datke later became the mayor of the Nagpur Municipal Corporation.

Positions held

Within BJP

Nagpur President, BJYM (2010)
General Secretary, BJYM, Maharashtra (2010-2016)
General Secretary, BJYM, Maharashtra (2016-2017)
National Vice President, BJYM (2017 onwards)
Nagpur City President, BJP (2020 onwards)

Legislative

Corporator in Nagpur Municipal Corporation Since 2004
Mayor, City of Nagpur – (2014-2017)

References

Politicians from Nagpur
Living people
Mayors of Nagpur
1978 births
Marathi politicians
Bharatiya Janata Party politicians from Maharashtra
Maharashtra local politicians